Yannick Bastos (born 30 May 1993) is a Luxembourger international footballer who plays as a winger, who currently plays for FC Progrès Niederkorn.

Career
Bastos spent his early career in Luxembourg and Germany, playing for US Rumelange, SV Eintracht Trier 05 and FC Differdange 03. On 31 January 2014, Bastos joined English club Bolton Wanderers for an undisclosed fee on a one-and-a-half year contract. He was released by the club in September 2014, having never made a first-team appearance for the club.

He made his senior international debut for Luxembourg in 2013.

Personal life
Bastos is of Portuguese descent.

References

1993 births
Living people
Luxembourgian footballers
Luxembourg international footballers
Luxembourgian people of Portuguese descent
US Rumelange players
FC Differdange 03 players
SV Eintracht Trier 05 players
Bolton Wanderers F.C. players
Association football wingers
Luxembourgian expatriate footballers
Luxembourgian expatriate sportspeople in Germany
Expatriate footballers in Germany
Luxembourgian expatriate sportspeople in England
Expatriate footballers in England
FC Progrès Niederkorn players